The new evangelization is the particular process by which baptized members of the Catholic Church express the general Christian call to evangelization.

According to Pope Francis in Evangelii gaudium in 2013: "the XIII Ordinary General Assembly of the Synod of Bishops gathered from 7–28 October 2012 to discuss the theme: The New Evangelization for the Transmission of the Christian Faith. The Synod reaffirmed that the new evangelization is a summons addressed to all and that it is carried out in three principal settings".  The three settings were: 1) ordinary pastoral ministry (to inflame the hearts of the faithful), 2) outreach to "the baptized whose lives do not reflect the demands of Baptism" and 3) evangelization to those who do not know Jesus Christ or who have always rejected him.

Relative to the second setting, one emphasis has been re-evangelizing of Christians who have fallen away from the faith.  There has been a special focus on Europe and the Americas, areas which have traditionally been Catholic but which have been heavily influenced by secularization.

The Catholic Church has always had a mandate for missions and evangelism and this accompanies the church into the new, Third Millennium.

Background
In the very first sentence of its Constitution on the Church, Lumen gentium, the Second Vatican Council affirmed that Christ had sent the church to preach the gospel to every creature (LG 1; cf. Mk 16:15).  Evangelism is a theme in multiple Vatican II documents.  These documents mentioned “gospel” 157 times, “evangelize” 18 times, and “evangelization” 31 times.

For several decades, the magisterium of the Roman Catholic Church has been promoting a theme of new evangelization. This includes re-evangelism of Christian people as well as mission Ad gentes to reach new regions and cultures.

Birthplace of the new evangelization

The birthplace of the new evangelization was Nowa Huta near Kraków in Poland where strenuous efforts for many years were made during communist rule to establish church land and a cross and church building in a new town where there was none.  Speaking at Mogila Abbey near Nowa Huta in 1979, Pope John Paul II said: "From the Cross of Nowa Huta began the new evangelization"

Papal use of new evangelization
The first papal use of the term new evangelization was by Pope Paul VI in his 1975 apostolic exhortation, Evangelii nuntiandi, which itself built upon documents from the Second Vatican Council including Lumen gentium, Ad gentes, Gaudium et spes, and Dignitatis humanae.

The term was popularized by Pope John Paul II who used it during an address to the Latin American bishops in Port-au-Prince, Haiti on May 9, 1983.  He declared that the fifth centenary of the first evangelization of the Americas (1492–1992) should mark the beginning of a new era of evangelization, "evangelization will gain its full energy if it is a commitment, not to re-evangelize but to a New Evangelization, new in its ardor, methods and expression". Pope John Paul II then expounded on the idea later, including his 1990 encyclical, Redemptoris missio, a Magna Carta of the new evangelization, his 1994 apostolic letter, Tertio millennio adveniente, issued for the Great Jubilee of the year 2000 and his 2001 apostolic exhortation, Novo millennio ineunte. In Redemptoris missio, he wrote:

 
In 2010, Pope Benedict XVI established the Pontifical Council for Promoting the New Evangelization.  When he called for a Year of Faith from 2012 to 2013 on the 50th anniversary of the Second Vatican Council, he opened it with a general assembly of the Synod of Bishops on The New Evangelization for the Transmission of the Christian Faith.

On June 29, 2013, Pope Francis released a related apostolic exhortation Evangelii gaudium (English: The Joy of the Gospel) on "the church's primary mission of evangelization in the modern world".   In its opening paragraph, Pope Francis urged the entire church "to embark on a new chapter of evangelism".

As of April 2019, Pope Francis was reported to be planning a reorganization of the Curia that will make evangelization its principal focus. A final draft of his apostolic constitution on the Roman Curia, titled Praedicate Evangelium (“Preach the Gospel”), has been submitted for comment to national bishops’ conferences and a variety of other bodies.

Synod of Bishops

Responses to papal appeals

Since Pope John Paul II, the cultural sector was seen as one of the many priorities of the new evangelization. In recent years, therefore, the Catholic Church promoted her artistic heritage in several countries as a pastoral opportunity for the new evangelization, particularly in Europe.

In 2005, the Augustine Institute in Denver was established to train lay Catholics for the new evangelization.

In 2011, Saint John's Seminary in Boston established a Theological Institute for the New Evangelization, which offers a Master's of Theological Studies for the New Evangelization. Despite being located at a seminary, the program is designed for laity, deacons, and professed religious.

In 2012, Franciscan University of Steubenville established the Father Michael Scanlan Chair of Biblical Theology and the New Evangelization.

In 2012, The Catholic Bishops’ Conference of the Philippines issued a pastoral letter on the new evangelization with a nine year plan to help prepare Catholics for 2021, the 500th anniversary of the arrival of the Gospel in the Philippines.

On 12 December 2020, the feast of Our Lady of Guadalupe, the Archdiocese of Sydney announced its archdiocese-wide plan for evangelism called "Go Make Disciples". Go Make Disciples is the most far-reaching attempt to harness the resources of the Catholic Church within Australia in the service of the new evangelisation called for by all the modern popes since Pope Paul VI. It represents the personal vision of Archbishop Anthony Fisher for the future of the Archdiocese of Sydney.

New media and new evangelization 

New media tools such as the internet, social media and smartphones are being used as vehicles for expressing the new evangelization.  Media organizations like EWTN, National Catholic Register, Word on Fire, Catholic Answers are using the new media to promote the work of evangelization.  Individuals do the same with their social media accounts like Facebook and Twitter.

References

Further reading

External links
 The Birthplace of the New Evangelization - Nowa Huta near Krakow, Poland.
 Pontifical Council For Promoting the New Evangelization
 United States Conference of Catholic Bishops, Committee on Evangelization and Catechesis
 Go and Make Disciples: A National Plan and Strategy for Catholic Evangelization in the United States, 2002, United States Conference of Catholic Bishops, Inc., Washington, D.C. 
 Scott Hahn resource page for the New Evangelization
 Prayer for the New Evangelization-USCCB

Catholic theology and doctrine
Catholic missions
Evangelism